Castle of Alvito is a medieval castle in the civil parish in Alvito, municipality of Alvito, the Portuguese district of Beja.

It is classified as a National Monument.

Alvito
National monuments in Beja District
Alvito